The hypogastrium (also called the  hypogastric region or suprapubic region) is a region of the abdomen located below the umbilical region.

Etymology
The roots of the word hypogastrium mean "below the stomach"; the roots of suprapubic mean "above the pubic bone".

Boundaries
The upper limit is the umbilicus while the pubis bone constitutes its lower limit. The lateral boundaries are formed are drawing straight lines through the midway between the anterior superior iliac spine and symphisis pubis.

References

External links
 

Abdomen